Shaun Devine is an Australian former professional rugby league footballer who played professionally for the Western Suburbs Magpies and the Western Reds.

Playing career
Devine played for the Western Suburbs Magpies between 1990 and 1993 in the NSWRL Premiership. In 1994 he played for the Rockingham Coastal Sharks in the Western Australia Rugby League competition. He then played for the new Western Reds franchise between 1995 and 1997.

In 2008 he was involved in the formation of the Hinterland Storm club in the Bycroft Cup on the Gold Coast.

References

Living people
Australian rugby league players
1970 births
Rugby league fullbacks
Western Suburbs Magpies players
Western Reds players
Place of birth missing (living people)